Fun-Plex is an amusement park located at 7003 Q Street in the Ralston neighborhood of Omaha, Nebraska. It is the largest amusement park in Nebraska, Fun-Plex began as “The Kart Ranch” in 1979 with just a go-kart track. In 2015 Fun-Plex is putting a brand new water feature called Makana Splash a water play structure with a 317-gallon bucket that drops water on you. In 2016 Fun-Plex built Nebraska's Only Swim up bar called Breakers Bay Bar. In 2018 Fun-Plex adds Rockin’ Rapids, the biggest and most impressive addition to the park in 40 years! The attraction features two tube slides for single or double riders.

About
Rides at Fun-Plex include a slick track, bumper boats, and go-gator kiddie coaster. There is a waterpark with a wave pool, five story waterslides, a lazy river, and a children's pool. Other rides includes the Rock-O-Ride,  a Tilt-A-Whirl, as well as a classic carousel and the Balloon Ferris wheel. In 2007, the facility boasted new go-karts and a larger track, as well a new 18-hole miniature golf. In 2007, the park introduced the "Big Ohhhh...", Nebraska's only roller coaster. The coaster has been used at several other parks previous to coming to Fun-Plex.  The roller coaster was removed in 2018.

References

External links
 Official website
 

Amusement parks in Omaha, Nebraska
Amusement parks opened in 1979
Tourist attractions in Omaha, Nebraska
1979 establishments in Nebraska